Takhatpur is a Nagar Palika in Bilaspur district in the Indian state of Chhattisgarh.

Geography

It has a state Technical Education college named JMP College, which is associated with Bilaspur University.

Political scenario
Late Shri Manharanlal Pandey was elected as MLA five times from Takhatpur. He served as Home, Irrigation and Jail minister in unified MP state. He was also a member of the 11th Lok Sabha of India. He represented the Janjgir constituency of Chhattisgarh and is a member of the Bharatiya Janata Party.

In the legislative elections of 2018, Dr. (Mrs.) Rashmi Ashish Singh of Indian National Congress won with a margin of 2500 votes against BJP candidate. She is the Daughter in law of ex MLA of Takhatpur Mr. Balram Singh Thakur and Daughter of ex MLA of Takhatpur Mr. Rohini Kumar Bajpai.

Mr. Balram Singh Thakur, two times MLA of Takhatpur played a major role in the development of Takhatpur. Mr. Raju Singh Kshatriya ex MLA of Takhatpur, Mr. Jagjit Singh Makkad( Ex MLA ), Mr P.C.A Julius Mr. Kuddus Ansari, Mr. Shrikant Kanhaiyalal Mishra (lecturer), Mr. Ajay, Dewangan (ex President, Nagar Panchayat) are prominent residents of Takhatpur and have contributed to the area's educational and medical welfare. Mr Vivek Pandey is a prominent leader and advocate who is working towards the social welfare of the local communities. . 
Mrs. Harshita Pandey Ex president of Chhattisgarh State women commission and presently member of National women commission is a prominent women BJP leader from Takhatpur but lost the State Assembly election in 2018. She is daughter of Late Shri Manharanlal Pandey (Ex Home Minister of MP).
Mr Anirudh Dwivedi two times state leader of abvp does work for welfare of students and he was teacher also.
Dharmyesh Pandey

Demographics
 Indian census, Takhatpur had a population of 22,989. Males constitute 51% of the population and females 49%. Takhatpur has an average literacy rate of 68%, higher than the national average of 59.5%: male literacy is 76%, and female literacy is 59%. In Takhatpur, 14% of the population is under 6 years of age.

References

Cities and towns in Bilaspur district, Chhattisgarh